USS Stadtfeld (DE-29) was an  constructed for the United States Navy during World War II. It was promptly sent off into the Pacific Ocean to protect convoys and other ships from Japanese submarines and fighter aircraft. By the end of the war, when she returned to the United States, she was awarded four battle stars.
 
She was laid down for the United Kingdom under the designation BDE-29 on 26 November 1942 by the Mare Island Navy Yard, Vallejo, California; and was launched on 17 May 1943. Her assignment to the Royal Navy was cancelled and the destroyer escort was redesignated DE-29 on 16 June 1943. She was commissioned in the United States Navy on 26 August 1943.

Namesake
Sanford Stadtfeld was born on 18 June 1917 in San Francisco, California. He commissioned an Ensign in the United States Naval Reserve on 10 July 1939. He was promoted to Lieutenant on 15 June 1942 and killed in action during the Battle of Tassafaronga on 30 November 1942.

World War II Pacific Theatre operations
After her shakedown and yard availability period, the ship sailed on 31 October for Hawaii and arrived at Pearl Harbor on 10 November. She then screened fueling units from there to Funafuti, Ellice Islands, and to Espiritu Santo, New Hebrides Islands. After escorting fueling units for the Gilbert Islands Operation, she departed Funafuti for Tarawa on 18 December 1943 and, five days later, was rerouted to Pearl Harbor.
 
Stadtfeld sortied, on 16 January 1944, as a screening unit of Task Unit 58.2.1 to participate in the conquest of the Marshall Islands and operated out of Majuro until sailing for Hawaii on 12 February. On 2 March, the ship departed Pearl Harbor en route to Funafuti, but was rerouted to Guadalcanal. Escort duty between the Solomon Islands and the Admiralty, Russell, and New Hebrides Islands followed until 1 May, including voyages to Emirau on 30 March and Green Island on 13 April. After a short tender availability period at Espiritu Santo, the destroyer escort resumed escort duty in the Solomons.
 
Stadtfeld was routed to Manus on 22 September 1944. In October, she was ordered to the Palau Islands and operated there until mid-November when she sailed for Guam. She escorted convoys from there to Kossol Roads, Manus, and Eniwetok. On 12 February 1945, Stadtfeld was assigned duty as an escort for a convoy from Eniwetok to Iwo Jima.  She arrived at Iwo Jima on 13 March and returned to Eniwetok via Saipan. The ship then performed escort duty between the Marshall and Caroline islands until 6 July when she was ordered back to Pearl Harbor. From Hawaii, she was routed on to Mare Island, California, for overhaul.

End-of-War Deactivation 

Yard availability began on 20 July; but, after the termination of hostilities with Japan, all work was stopped on 16 August.
 
Stadtfeld was decommissioned at Mare Island on 15 November 1945 and was struck from the Navy List on 28 November. She was sold for scrap in July 1947.

Awards

References

External links
 

Evarts-class destroyer escorts
Ships built in Vallejo, California
1943 ships
World War II frigates and destroyer escorts of the United States